Just to Feel Anything is a studio album by American instrumental band Emeralds. It was released on Editions Mego in 2012.

Critical reception

At Metacritic, which assigns a weighted average score out of 100 to reviews from mainstream critics, the album received an average score of 71, based on 20 reviews, indicating "generally favorable reviews".

Fred Thomas of AllMusic gave the album 3.5 stars out of 5, writing: "The amped-up chiptunes and film score moments are interesting enough, but the band sound their best when expanding on the lush tones and tension-laden improvisations they've been working on since the beginning." Mike Diver of BBC called the album "another essential Emeralds acquisition."

Track listing

Personnel
Credits adapted from liner notes.

Emeralds
 Mark McGuire – music, mixing, photography
 Steve Hauschildt – music, mixing, photography
 John Elliott – music, mixing

Technical personnel
 Andrew Veres – recording, mixing
 James Plotkin – mastering
 Mark Fell – artwork, typography
 Michael Pollard – layout assistance

References

External links
 

2012 albums
Electronic albums by American artists